Konstantinos Staikos (born 1943) is a Greek architect and book historian. He was born in Athens. He studied interior architecture and design in Paris, and has been practicing in that field since the 1960s. In the early 1970s he started to take a serious interest in the history of Greek books during the period of the Greek diaspora (from the Fall of Constantinople in 1453 to about 1830). In his professional capacity he was commissioned to redesign and reorganize two historic libraries of the Christian world: those of the Monastery of St John on Patmos (founded in 1089), completed in 1989, and of the Ecumenical Patriarchate in the Phanar, Constantinople (dating from 353, soon after the city's official inauguration as the capital of the Eastern Roman Empire), completed in 1993.
Towards the end of the 1980s he embarked on a systematic study of the history of libraries in the countries of the Mediterranean Basin and the Near East, from earliest antiquity to the Renaissance (about 3000 BC to AD 1600). This took him to all the most important monastic and secular libraries in Europe, to gather material about their founders and their history, and necessitated a great deal of research to discover what could be learnt from ancient Greek and Latin and other early sources about the methods of book distribution, the book trade and book-collecting – from the papyrus roll to the codex and the printed book –, as well as the evolution of library architecture over those four and a half millennia.

Among his publications are The Great Libraries (2000), the five volumes History of the Library in Western Civilization, Oak Knoll Press (2001-2013) and the Books and Ideas. The Library of Plato and of the Academy, Oak Knoll Press (2013).

The Konstantinos Staikos' book collection was acquired by the Onassis Foundation in 2010 to be preserved as perpetual property of the Greek Nation, to make these books accessible to researchers, being gradually uploaded on the Internet so that they may be reached by as many people as possible. The Konstantinos Staikos' book collection was renamed to "Hellenic Library of the Onassis Foundation" and is housed in the neoclassical building at 56 Amalias Avenue Plaka, Athens, Greece.

Works
 The Great Libraries: From the Antiquities to the Renaissance, New Castle, Del.: Oak Knoll Press, 2000.
 The History of the Library in Western Civilization, translated by Timothy Cullen, New Castle, Del.: Oak Knoll Press, 2004-2013 (six volumes: 1. From Minos to Cleopatra; 2. From Cicero to Hadrian; 3. From Constantine the Great to cardinal Bessarion; 4. From Cassiodorus to Furnival: classical and Christian letters, schools and libraries in the monasteries and universities, Western book centres; 5. From Petrarch to Michelangelo: the revival of the study of the classics and the first humanistic libraries printing in the service of the world of books and monumental libraries; 6. Epilogue and General Index).
 Books and Ideas: The Library of Plato and the Academy, New Castle, Del.: Oak Knoll Press, 2013.
 Testimonies of Platonic Tradition. From the 4th BCE to the 16th Century, New Castle, Del.: Oak Knoll Press, 2015.
 Mouseion and the Library of the Ptolemies in Alexandria: Alexander the Great's Vision of a Universal Intellectual Centre, New Castle, Del.: Oak Knoll Press, 2021.

References

1943 births
Living people
Architects from Athens
20th-century Greek historians
21st-century Greek historians